Lamab-e Gol Espid (also Romanized as Lamāb-e Gol Espīd) is a village in Margown Rural District, Margown District, Boyer-Ahmad County, Kohgiluyeh and Boyer-Ahmad Province, Iran. At the 2006 census, its population was 47, in 7 families.

References 

Populated places in Boyer-Ahmad County